The 2023 Carinthian state election was held in the Austrian state of Carinthia on 5 March 2023.

Background 
In the 2018 state election, the SPÖ became the strongest party with 47.9% of the vote. The FPÖ obtained 23.0%, the ÖVP obtained 15.5%, and the Team Carinthia achieved 5.7% of the vote. 

Other parties like the BZÖ, ERDE, the Greens, the KPÖ and NEOS did not reach the electoral threshold of 5%.

In June 2017, the Proporz-system was abolished in Carinthia. As a result, a coalition between the SPÖ and the ÖVP was formed after the 2018 election - in which the SPÖ fell just one seat short of an absolute majority.

Electoral system 
There is a 5% hurdle for entering the Carinthian state parliament, but parties can also win a seat outright in one of the 4 electoral constituencies (Grundmandat). Anyone who has their main residence in Carinthia and Austrian citizenship on the key date of January 3, 2023 and is at least 16 years old on the day of the election is entitled to vote. Parties need 100 declarations of support in each of the four constituencies or declarations of support from three members of the state parliament in order to gain ballot access. The deadline for submitting the declarations of support ended on 27 January 2023.

Contesting parties 
The table below lists parties represented in the previous Landtag. 

The candidacy of the parties represented in the state parliament (SPÖ, FPÖ, ÖVP and Team Carinthia) was secured from the start, with the signatures of at least 3 members of the Landtag.

Additional parties on the ballot

Due to their exit from the state parliament in the 2018 election, the Greens had to collect declarations of support in order to gain ballot access. The same applied to NEOS, which had never been represented in the Carinthian state parliament. The new Vision Austria party also tried to get declarations of support. The party was founded by Alexander Todor-Kostic, former state spokesman and designated top candidate of the MFG. The BZÖ tried to run together with other lists as part of the Free Citizens' Party under the name Alliance for Carinthia. The small environmentalist party Responsibility Earth, which achieved respectable success in 2018, will not run in 2023. The KPÖ and the Stark list were only able to gather enough signatures in a few constituencies. 

The state elections authority thus announced on 27 January 2023 that nominations for the state elections on 5 March 2023 had been submitted by ten campaigning groups within the deadline.

The following 4 parties will also be on the ballot statewide (with their lead candidates):

 The Greens of Carinthia (abbreviation: GRÜNE) with lead candidate Olga Voglauer (Member of the National Council, state spokeswoman for the Greens).
 NEOS - for Freedom, Progress and Justice (abbreviation: NEOS) with lead candidate Janos Juvan (entrepreneur, municipal council member in Klagenfurt, NEOS state spokesman).
 Vision Austria - Carinthia state party (abbreviation: VÖ) with lead candidate Alexander Todor-Kostic. (Lawyer, Vision Austria federal party spokesman).
 Alliance for Carinthia, Together for Fresach, A Good Option, Free State of Carinthia, List Jörg (abbreviation: BFK) with lead candidate Karlheinz Klement (BZÖ General Secretary).

Only in constituencies 1 and 2 (Klagenfurt, Klagenfurt-Land, St. Veit an der Glan, Wolfsberg, Völkermarkt):

 List Stark (abbreviation: STARK) with lead candidate Johann Ehmann.

Only in constituency 3 (Villach, Villach-Land):

 Communist Party of Austria – Carinthia/Koroška (abbreviation: KPÖ) with lead candidate Karin Peuker.

After reviewing the election proposals, they were finally approved by the state electoral authority on Thursday, February 2, 2023.

Opinion polling

Results

Aftermath 
The SPÖ will negotiate with all 3 parties who are represented in the new Landtag, first with the FPÖ, then with the ÖVP and finally with the Team Carinthia. For the new term, experts predict a continuation of the current SPÖ-ÖVP government.

On 14 March 2023, the SPÖ started official coalition talks with the ÖVP.

References 

State elections in Austria
2023 elections in Austria